One Small Step (subtitled Live and Solo), is a live album by John Butler. It features 8 tracks from three previous John Butler Trio albums, recorded live at Twist & Shout Records in Colorado, United States. It was originally released in 2007 as  Live At Twist & Shout.

The albums inner gatefold also featured an advertisement for OxfamAUS's "Close The Gap" campaign, which aims at narrowing the difference between the average life span of indigenous and non-indigenous Australians (currently 17 years). $1 AUD from every sale of the record was donated to Close The Gap.

Track listing 

 "Used To Get High" (from Grand National) - 4:18
 "Treat Yo Mama" (from Sunrise Over Sea) - 5:41
 "Daniella" (from Grand National) - 3:22
 "Ocean" (from John Butler) - 9:53
 "Better Than" (from Grand National) - 4:20
 "Zebra" (from Sunrise Over Sea) - 3:53
 "Fire In The Sky" (from Grand National) - 3:47
 "Funky Tonight" (from Grand National) - 6:04

Personnel 

John Butler - Vocals, acoustic/amplified 11 string guitar, banjo, Weissenborn lapsteel, Harmonica
Artwork & Design by Tom Walker
Cover Photography by James Minchin
Live Photography by Chris Newman, Adam Whitehouse, Brad Woodard
Recorded by Ian Hlatky
Mixed by Jeff Juliano
Mastered by Brian "Big Bass" Gardner

References 

John Butler Trio albums
2007 live albums